this kid walks into a bar... is the sixth album from the band emmet swimming. It was their first album in 10 years.

Track listing

Personnel
Todd Watts - Vocals, Guitar
Erik Wenberg - Guitar, backing vocals
Scott Brotemarkle - Bass, backing vocals
Luke Michel - Bass
Tamer Eid - Drums
Marco Delmar - Engineer
Stephanie Milne - Engineer
Ken Barnum - Engineer
Jessica Bowles - Engineer
Paul David Hager - Engineer
Mark Williams - Engineer

References

Emmet Swimming albums
2013 albums